This is a list of indigenous persons in Canada who have been elected to the federal House of Commons, legislative assemblies of provinces and territories, and members appointed to the Senate.

The first Metis politicians elected to the House of Commons were Pierre Delorme and Angus McKay, elected as Conservative party MPs in 1871. The very first First Nations parliamentarian is Leonard Marchand.

There have been 46 Indigenous persons who have served as Members of Parliament, as well as 21 who have been named Senators. After the 2021 Canadian election, the highest number of Indigenous persons were elected to Parliament in history - with 11 MPs (3.3% of the House of Commons). Of the current Indigenous Members of Parliament, 6 are Liberals, 3 are New Democrats and 2 are Conservatives.

Provincially, Indigenous persons have been elected to 11 of the 13 legislatures – with only Nova Scotia and Prince Edward Island never having had indigenous representation. As of October 2022, there are currently 21 Indigenous people serving in six provincial legislatures. Of those members, 12 are New Democrats, seven are Conservatives (three Saskatchewan Party, two Manitoba Progressive Conservative, one BC Liberal, one CAQ), one is a Liberal, and one is Green Party.

In the territories, Indigenous persons form a majority of representatives in the legislatures of Nunavut and the Northwest Territories. Additionally, in Yukon, there are four indigenous MLAs (two Liberals, one New Democrat, and one Yukon Party).

Federal

House of Commons

Senate

Provincial

Alberta

British Columbia

Manitoba

New Brunswick

Newfoundland and Labrador

Northwest Territories

Nova Scotia
Nova Scotia is yet to elect an Indigenous MLA.

Nunavut

Ontario

Prince Edward Island
Prince Edward Island is yet to elect an Indigenous MLA.

Quebec

Saskatchewan

Yukon

Indigenous Politicians by Assembly Composition

House of Commons

Alberta Legislative Assembly

British Columbia Legislative Assembly

Manitoba Legislative Assembly

New Brunswick Legislative Assembly

Newfoundland and Labrador House of Assembly

Northwest Territories Legislative Assembly

Nova Scotia Legislative Assembly
No Indigenous representation.

Nunavut Legislative Assembly

Ontario Legislative Assembly

Prince Edward Island
No Indigenous representation.

Quebec National Assembly

Saskatchewan Legislative Assembly

Yukon Legislative Assembly

See also
List of electoral firsts in Canada
List of Jewish Canadian politicians
List of visible minority politicians in Canada
List of Native American politicians

References 

indigenous
Indigenous politics in Canada
 
Politicians